Nadia Peace Clancy (born 1986) is an Australian politician and former political adviser.

Early life, education and career
Clancy was born at Bedford Park in 1986. Her mother, Rosemary Clancy, served as mayor of Brighton Council and stood as the Labor candidate for the seat of Mitchell at the 2006 state election but was defeated by Kris Hanna.

Clancy attended Paringa Park Primary School and Brighton Secondary School before studying media and communications at the University of South Australia. She worked as adviser to Labor members of parliament, including then Minister for Foreign Affairs Kevin Rudd, ACT Chief Minister Katy Gallagher and SA federal MP Mark Butler. In 2009, she moved to Renmark to work as a producer for the ABC.

Political career
Clancy stood as the Labor candidate for the seat of Boothby in the 2019 federal election, losing to Liberal Nicolle Flint. She has been a Labor member of the South Australian House of Assembly since the 2022 state election, representing Elder. She replaced the Liberal assistant minister for Domestic and Family Violence, Carolyn Power, who had held the seat since 2018. She was supported in her campaign by mentorship through Emily's List Australia. She is a member of the party's left faction.

References 

1986 births
Living people
Members of the South Australian House of Assembly
Women members of the South Australian House of Assembly
21st-century Australian politicians
Australian Labor Party members of the Parliament of South Australia
21st-century Australian women politicians